The Netherlands and the United Kingdom have a strong political and economic partnership.

Over forty Dutch towns and cities are twinned with British towns and cities. Both English and Dutch are West Germanic languages, with West Frisian, a minority language in the Netherlands, being the closest relative of the English language if one excludes Scots. In addition, between 90% and 93% of people in the Netherlands claim to speak English, although a negligible percentage of British people can speak Dutch.

The Netherlands has an embassy in London, and the United Kingdom has an embassy in The Hague and a consulate in Amsterdam. The UK also has a consulate in Willemstad, Curaçao.

There are also strong ties between the UK's overseas territory of Anguilla and the nearby Sint Maarten of the Netherlands.

Country comparison

History

Early Modern Relations 

In the mid-seventeenth century, after the Dutch had made peace in their war of independence from Spain and the former Kingdoms of England, Scotland and Ireland were being united under Cromwell's Commonwealth, Oliver St John was sent to Holland to moot the possibility of unifying the Dutch Republic with the Commonwealth, as fellow Protestant, seafaring republics, though the plan did not come to pass.

The Anglo-Dutch wars were battles between England (and the Kingdom of Great Britain during the fourth war) and the Dutch Republic during the 17th and 18th centuries. There were four wars in total, two were won by each side, and ended with the Fourth Anglo-Dutch War. The wars were largely fought to secure trade routes and to enable colonial expansion.

Glorious Revolution 
The Glorious Revolution, also called the Revolution of 1688, was the overthrow of King James II of England (VII of Scotland and II of Ireland) in 1688 by a union of Parliamentarians with an invading army led by the Dutch Republic stadtholder William III of Orange-Nassau (William of Orange) who, as a result, ascended the English throne as William III of England.

The crisis besetting King James II came to a head in 1688, when the King fathered a son, James Francis Edward Stuart on 10 June (Julian calendar), until then the throne would have passed to his daughter, Mary, a Protestant and the wife of William of Orange. The prospect of a Catholic dynasty in the kingdoms was now likely. Already troubled by the King's Catholicism and his close ties with France, key leaders of the Tories united with members of the opposition Whigs and set out to resolve the crisis by inviting William of Orange to England.

The invasion ended all attempts by England, in the Anglo-Dutch Wars of the 17th century, to subdue the Dutch Republic by military force. However, the personal union and the co-operation between the English and Dutch navies shifted the dominance in world trade from the Republic to England and then to the 18th century Kingdom of Great Britain.

Eight Articles of London 
The Eight Articles of London, also known as the London Protocol of 21 June 1814, were a secret convention between the  Great Powers: United Kingdom of Great Britain and Ireland, Prussia, Austria, and Russia to award the territory of current Belgium and the Netherlands to William I of the Netherlands, then "Sovereign Prince" of the United Netherlands. He accepted this award on 21 July 1814.

Anglo-Dutch Treaty of 1814 
The Anglo-Dutch Treaty of 1814 (also known as the Convention of London) was signed between the United Kingdom and the Netherlands in London on 13 August 1814. It was signed by Robert Stewart, Viscount Castlereagh, for the British and Hendrik Fagel for the Dutch.

The treaty returned the colonial possessions of the Dutch as they were at 1 January 1803 before the outbreak of the Napoleonic Wars, in the Americas, Africa, and Asia with the exceptions of the Cape of Good Hope and the South American settlements of Demerara, Essequibo, and Berbice, where the Dutch retained trading rights. In addition, the British ceded to the Dutch Bangka Island in the Indonesian Archipelago in exchange for the settlement of Kochi and its dependencies on the coast of Malabar, in India. The Dutch also ceded the district of Barnagore, situated close to Calcutta, in exchange for an annual fee. The treaty noted a declaration of 15 June 1814, by the Dutch that ships for the slave trade were no longer permitted in British ports and it agreed that this restriction would be extended to a ban on involvement in the slave trade by Dutch citizens. Britain also agreed to pay £1,000,000 to Sweden to resolve a claim to the Caribbean island of Guadeloupe (see Guadeloupe Fund). The British and the Dutch agreed to spend £2,000,000 each on improving the defences of the Low Countries. More funds, of up to £3,000,000, are mentioned for the "final and satisfactory settlement of the Low Countries in union with Holland." Disputes arising from this treaty were the subject of the Anglo-Dutch Treaty of 1824.

Anglo-Dutch Treaty of 1824 
The Anglo-Dutch Treaty of 1824, also known as the Treaty of London (one of several), was signed between the United Kingdom and the United Kingdom of the Netherlands in London in March 1824. The treaty sought to resolve disputes arising from the execution of the Anglo-Dutch Treaty of 1814. For the Dutch, it was signed by Hendrik Fagel and Anton Reinhard Falck, and for the UK, George Canning and Charles Williams-Wynn.

World War II 
During World War II, the United Kingdom and the Netherlands were close allies. After the German occupation of the Netherlands, Queen Wilhelmina and the Dutch government found refuge in Britain. The Royal Netherlands Navy brought most of its ships to England.

A few Dutch pilots escaped and joined the Royal Air Force to fight in the Battle of Britain. In July 1940, two all-Dutch squadrons were formed with Royal Netherlands Navy personnel and Fokker seaplanes from the Dutch naval air service: 320 Squadron and 321 Squadron (which afterwards moved to Sri Lanka). In 1943, an all-Dutch fighter squadron was formed in the UK, 322 Squadron.

Political relationship 

The United Kingdom and the Netherlands are both countries that are run under a constitutional monarchy. King Willem-Alexander of the Netherlands is around 890th in line to the British throne.

The United Kingdom and the Netherlands co-operate on a project to help people living in the developing world adapt to climate change.

The Infrared Astronomical Satellite was the first-ever space-based observatory to perform a survey of the entire sky at infrared wavelengths. Launched in 1983, its mission lasted ten months. The telescope was a joint project of the Netherlands (NIVR), and the United Kingdom (SERC) as well as the USA.

While commenting on British-Dutch relations Doug Henderson stated in 1997 that:

We like fair play and straightforwardness (direct honesty). We have a deep interest and a sense of responsibility for what goes on in the wider world. We both share a commitment to global trade and have both traditionally promoted strong trans-Atlantic links. Furthermore, as former colonial powers, we both have important international interests.

His Dutch counterpart Frits Bolkestein responded by saying:

In the past the Netherlands was a staunch supporter of British entry into the European community. Apart from feeling sympathy for the British people, this was motivated by our common value and interests, such as long-standing and deeply-rooted democratic tradition, the Atlantic outlook, the free market orientation and two large multi-nationals, Shell and Unilever, with a common Dutch-British origin.

Economic partnership 

Royal Dutch Shell and Unilever are both joint British/Dutch businesses. The Netherlands-British Chamber of Commerce was established to further economic co-operation between the two countries. In 2006 the Netherlands imported £16.6bn worth of goods from the United Kingdom, making it the UK's fifth biggest export market. Dutch-British trade is made simpler by good relations, transparent legal framework, sophisticated financial services system, good transport links and close geographical proximity. It is possible to reach either country by train, Eurostar, ferry or aeroplane.

Twinnings
  Alkmaar, North Holland and  Bath, Somerset
  Almelo, Overijssel and  Preston, Lancashire
  Almere, Flevoland and  Milton Keynes (and associated town with the City of Lancaster)
  Amstelveen, North Holland and  Woking, Surrey
  Amsterdam, North Holland and  Manchester, Greater Manchester
  Arnhem, Gelderland and  Airdrie, North Lanarkshire
  Arnhem, Gelderland and  Croydon, Greater London
  Cuijk, North Brabant and  Maldon, Essex
  Delft, South Holland and  Kingston upon Thames, Greater London
  Dordrecht, South Holland and  Hastings, East Sussex
  Gouda, South Holland and  Gloucester, Gloucestershire
  Graft-De Rijp, North Holland and  Chalfont St. Giles, Buckinghamshire
  Groningen, Groningen Province and  Newcastle-upon-Tyne, Tyne and Wear
  Heemstede, North Holland and  Royal Leamington Spa, Warwickshire
  Haaren, North Brabant and  Desborough, Northamptonshire
  Hellevoetsluis, South Holland and  Torbay, Devon
  Leiden, South Holland and  Oxford, Oxfordshire
  Meerssen, Limburg and  Sherborne, Dorset
  Rotterdam, South Holland and  Hull, East Riding of Yorkshire
  Stampersgat, North Brabant and  Cheltenham, Gloucestershire
  Zutphen, Gelderland and  Shrewsbury, Shropshire

Armed forces 

The Royal Marines and Netherlands Marine Corps are allied through a 'Bond of friendship'.

Since 1973, units of the Netherlands Marine Corps have formed part of the British 3 Commando Brigade during exercises and real conflict situations. Together, these form the UK/NL Landing Force. Either the First or the Second Marine Combat Group can be assigned as the Dutch contribution to this force.

The co-operation between the Korps Mariniers and the Royal Marines has led to extensive integration in the areas of operations, logistics and materials. Within NATO this is seen as a prime example of what can be achieved in military integration.

In combined NLMC and Royal Marines actions by the British and Dutch navies during the War of the Spanish Succession (1702–1713), amphibious operations were carried out, the most notable being the capture of Gibraltar in 1704. During this action, a successful attack was carried out against the fortress of Gibraltar by an 1800-strong brigade of Dutch and British Marines under the command of Prince George of Hesse-Darmstadt. Both corps share this battle honour.

The nickname of the Dutch Marines among their British Royal Marine counterparts is "Cloggies", a reference to the historic wearing of clogs by some Dutch people.
Royal Navy Submarine Service officers taking the Submarine Command Course use a Dutch submarine simulator for part of the course.

See also 
 Foreign relations of the United Kingdom
 Foreign relations of the Netherlands
 List of diplomats from the United Kingdom to the Netherlands
 Dutch people in the United Kingdom
 List of Dutch Britons
 European Union–United Kingdom relations

References

Further reading 
 Ashton, Nigel. Unspoken Allies: Anglo-Dutch Relations since 1780. .  Google Books
 Horn, David Bayne. Great Britain and Europe in the eighteenth century (1967). Covers 1603–1702; pp. 86–110.
 Jones, James Rees. The Anglo-Dutch Wars of the Seventeenth Century (Routledge, 2013)
 Levy,  Jack S. "The Rise and Decline of the Anglo-Dutch Rivalry, 1609–1689", pp. 172–200 in William R. Thompson, ed. Great power rivalries (1999) online
 Palmer, M. A. J. "The Military Revolution Afloat: The Era of the Anglo-Dutch Wars and the Transition to Modern Warfare at Sea". War in History (1997) 4#2. pp. 123–149.
 Raven, G. J. A., and Nicholas A. M. Rodger. Navies and Armies: The Anglo-Dutch Relationship in War and Peace, 1688–1988 (John Donald, 1990).
 
 Wigglesworth, Neil. Holland at War Against Hitler: Anglo-Dutch Relations, 1940–1945 (Psychology Press, 1990)
 Wilson, Charles Henry. Anglo-Dutch Commerce & Finance in the Eighteenth Century (1941)

External links 
 Our Kinsfolk in the Netherlands - "Always closely associated with Britain"
 Anglo-Dutch society
 A look into the long-lasting links between Britain and Holland forged during the war
 "England and the Netherlands: the ties between two nations"
 "William: A razor sharp cynic"

 
United Kingdom
Bilateral relations of the United Kingdom